Victor Kofi Aidoo is a Ghanaian politician and was a member of the first parliament of the second Republic of Ghana. He represented Twifo-Heman-Denkyira constituency under the membership of the progress party (PP)

Early life and education 
Victor was born on 14 March 1930 in Dunkwa, Central Region, Ghana. He attended Achimota School, University of Science and Technology where he obtained his Bachelor of Science in pharmaceutical chemistry. He was the president of the Pharmaceutical Society of Ghana and later worked as a pharmacist before entering Parliament.

Politics 
He began his political career in 1969 when he became the parliamentary candidate for the Progress Party (PP) to represent his constituency in the Central Region of Ghana prior to the commencement of the 1969 Ghanaian parliamentary election.

He was sworn into the First Parliament of the Second Republic of Ghana on 1 October 1969, after being pronounced winner at the 1969 Ghanaian election held on 26 August 1969. and his tenure ended on 13 January 1972.

Personal life 
He is a Catholic. He is married with two daughters and one son.

References 

Progress Party (Ghana) politicians
1930 births
Living people
People from Central Region (Ghana)
Ghanaian pharmacists
Ghanaian MPs 1969–1972
Alumni of Achimota School